The 2020–21 Hofstra Pride men's basketball team represented Hofstra University during the 2020–21 NCAA Division I men's basketball season. The Pride were coached by Mike Farrelly, who served as acting head coach while Joe Mihalich was out on a temporary medical leave of absence. They played their home games at Mack Sports Complex in Hempstead, New York as members of the Colonial Athletic Association. In a season limited due to the ongoing COVID-19 pandemic, the Pride finished the season 13–10, 8–6 in CAA play to finish in fourth place. They defeated Delaware in the quarterfinals of the CAA tournament before losing to Elon in the semifinals.

Previous season
The Pride finished the 2019–20 season 26–8, 14–4 in CAA play to win the regular season CAA championship. They defeated Drexel and Delaware to advance to the championship game of the CAA tournament. There they defeated Northeastern to win the tournament championship and receive the conference's automatic bid to the NCAA tournament. However, the tournament was canceled due to the COVID-19 pandemic.

Offseason

Departures

Incoming transfers

2020 recruiting class

Roster

Schedule and results

|-
!colspan=9 style=| Non-conference regular season

|-
!colspan=12 style=| CAA regular season

|-
!colspan=9 style=| CAA tournament
|-

Source

References

Hofstra Pride men's basketball seasons
Hofstra
Hofstra Pride men's basketball
Hofstra Pride men's basketball